Korine is a surname. Notable people with the surname include:

Harmony Korine (born 1973), American film director, producer, screenwriter, writer and actor
Rachel Korine (born 1986), American actress
Raph Korine (born 1994), reality TV personality, runner-up of Big Brother 2017 UK, lived in Zurich, Switzerland

See also 

 Corine (disambiguation)